Jacopo Bartolomeo Beccari (25 July 1682 – 18 January 1766) was an Italian chemist, one of the leading scientists in Bologna in the first half of the eighteenth century. He is mainly known as the discoverer of the gluten in wheat flour.

Life

Jacopo Bartolomeo Beccari was born in Bologna on 25 July 1682.
In 1737 he was the first to give courses in chemistry at an Italian university. 
He carried out important research on the phosphorescence of bodies, and studied the measurement of the intensity of the light emitted (De rebus aliisque adamant in phosphorum numerum referendis, 1745). 
He also studied the action of light on silver salts (De vi, quam ipsa per se lux habet, non colores modo, sed etiam texturam rerum, salvis interdum coloribus, immutandi, 1757).
From his comments on foraminifera he is considered as one of the pioneers of microbiology.

Working at the Academy of Sciences of Bologna Institute, Beccari looked for ways to make populations resistant to famine through a new type of emergency diet.

Beccari died in Bologna on 18 January 1766.

References
Citations

Sources

1682 births
1766 deaths
Scientists from Bologna
18th-century Italian chemists